Nuestra Señora de la Paz is a Sector in the city of Santo Domingo in the Distrito Nacional of the Dominican Republic.

Sources 
Distrito Nacional sectors

Populated places in Santo Domingo